Sauda may refer to:

Places

Lebanon
Qurnet es-Sauda, the highest point in Lebanon and the Levant

Norway
Sauda, a municipality in Rogaland county
Sauda (town), a town in the municipality of Sauda in Rogaland county
Sauda Church, a church in the town of Sauda in Rogaland county
Sauda Smelteverk, a smelting plant in the town of Sauda in Rogaland county
Sauda Skisenter, a skiing facility, located near the town of Sauda in Rogaland county

Syria
Al-Sauda, a town in northwestern Syria

People
Mirza Muhammad Rafi Sauda, an Urdu poet from Delhi, India

Other
Sauda-class mine countermeasures vessel, a class of ships in the Royal Norwegian Navy from 1953 to 1996
Dera Sacha Sauda, a non-profit Social Welfare and Spiritual Organization in Sirsa, Haryana, India
Sauda (film), a 1995 Hindi-language Indian feature film directed by Ramesh Modi